Karunam is a 2000 Indian Malayalam film,  directed and produced by Jayaraj. The film stars Biju Menon, Eliyamma, Madambu Kunjukuttan and Vavachan in lead roles. The film had musical score by Sunny Stephen. The film is the second installment in director Jayaraj's "Navarasa Series".

Cast
Biju Menon
Lena
Eliyamma
Madambu Kunjukuttan
Vavachan

Soundtrack
The music was composed by Sunny Stephen and the lyrics were written by Mariamma John and C. J. Kuttappan.

Awards
Golden Peacock (Best Film) at the 31st International Film Festival of India.
Filmfare Award for Best Film - Malayalam received by Jayaraj (2000)
 John Abraham Award for Best Malayalam Film (1999)

References

External links
 

2000 films
2000s Malayalam-language films
Films whose writer won the Best Original Screenplay National Film Award